Jewelbox is a computer game developed by Varcon Systems for the Macintosh. It is a clone of Sega's Columns.

Jewelbox was originally published as shareware, in 1992, and was developed by Rodney and Brenda Jacks, with music by Jim Holt. After its initial release, Jewelbox was published as a commercial game by Varcon Systems. The commercial version added many new features including support for different display sizes and more powerups including the ability to collect and play wildcard jewels whenever you wanted. Varcon sold the game individually and as part of a three-game package of arcade challenges.

Gameplay
Colored gems fall from the top of the screen, and the player must manipulate them to form patterns that erase themselves. When the playing area fills up with gems, the round is over. Special gems cause different things to happen. The player must manipulate the jewels to form lines of three or more horizontally, vertically or diagonally. Jewels are affected by gravity, allowing the player to set up chain reactions which multiply the value of the gems matched. When the playing area is filled, it is cleared and the player loses one life - unlike Tetris, the player is given three lives in each game, and the opportunity to earn additional lives by reaching points milestones. Gems are worth different numbers of points, with black onyx-like stones being the most valuable.

The game includes an easter egg where matching three black jewels on the bottom row of the play area resulted in a huge points bonus.

Reception
The game was reviewed in 1994 in Dragon #211 by Jay & Dee in the "Eye of the Monitor" column. Jay did not rate the game, but Dee gave the game 3½ out of 5 stars. Dee noted that the gameplay is vaguely similar to that of Tetris, but that "Jewelbox is not just a clone—it has intriguing rules all its own, including special gems that cause amazing things to happen, and beautiful sound and graphics".

Laurel Clyde, in the book Managing Infotech in School Library Media Centers mentions Jewelbox as one of the games "that pay homage to Tetris while extending the concept in new directions".

Larry Hanson, in his book Everything You Wanted to Know About the Mac, said that Jewelbox "deserves special praise, not only for its nice graphics and music, but also for its packaging. Instead of the shelf-hogging cardboard boxes most games come packed in, Jewelbox (like Varcon's other games) comes in a re-useable suede bag."

References

1992 video games
Classic Mac OS games
Classic Mac OS-only games
Falling block puzzle games
Video game clones
Video games developed in the United States